Tom Moore (1878 – 6 July 1943) was a Anglo-Canadian carpenter and trade unionist from Ontario.

Moore was born in Leeds, West Yorkshire, England. He emigrated to Canada in 1909 at the age of 31 and settled in Niagara Falls, Ontario. He was active in the United Brotherhood of Carpenters and Joiners of America at both the local and regional level, including working as an organizer for Eastern Canada from 1911 to 1918. In 1919, he served on the Royal Commission on Industrial Relations (Mathers Commission). In 1920, Moore was elected president of the American Federation of Labor-affiliated Trades and Labor Congress of Canada, a position he held until 1935. In 1938, he was re-elected to the position, which he held until 1943. He opposed radical unionism, including the One Big Union movement.

He was later a delegate to the International Labour Organization.

References

1878 births
1943 deaths
Trade unionists from Leeds
Trade unionists from Ontario
Canadian carpenters
English emigrants to Canada
International Labour Organization people
Presidents of the Trades and Labor Congress of Canada
United Brotherhood of Carpenters and Joiners of America people